Fine Tubes is a UK-based designer and manufacturer of stainless steel, nickel, zirconium, and titanium alloy tubes, based in Estover, Plymouth, Devon. These highly specialized tubes are used in oil and gas power plants, nuclear power plants, airspace and aeronautics, large scale chemical-industrial manufacturing, medical practice (including implants), and high performance liquid chromatography.

Sales for the company include: Munich, Germany; Orléans, France; New Delhi, India; and Houston, Texas. Of note, The company has supplied cooling tubes to the Large Hadron Collider at CERN.

In 2012, Fine Tubes was acquired along with its sister company, by The Watermill Group, an investment firm in the USA.  It now operates as a subsidiary of Tubes Holdco Limited.

References

Companies based in Plymouth, Devon
Manufacturing companies of the United Kingdom
British companies established in 1940
Manufacturing companies established in 1940
1940 establishments in England